The Hartford, Connecticut statue of Christopher Columbus is eight-foot tall bronze sculpture installed on Columbus Green, near Bushnell Park. The statue is by the artist Vincenzo Miserendino.

History
The statue was a gift of local Italian Americans and was dedicated on Columbus Day, October 12, 1926. 

On June 16, 2020, the City of Hartford ordered its removal.

See also

 List of monuments and memorials to Christopher Columbus

References

Buildings and structures in Hartford, Connecticut
Monuments and memorials in Connecticut
Monuments and memorials removed during the George Floyd protests
Sculptures of men in Connecticut
Statues in Connecticut
Hartford, Connecticut
Statues removed in 2020